The Basel S-Bahn has provided an S-Bahn-style rail service connecting the Basel metropolitan area since 1997 in Switzerland, Germany and France. It consists of eight suburban train lines, including four that operate across borders.

The S-Bahn is operated by the Swiss Federal Railways (SBB CFF FFS), its German subsidiary SBB GmbH, the German DB, and the French SNCF Mobilités. The responsible transport authorities are the Swiss cantons of Basel-City, Basel-Country, Aargau, Solothurn, Jura; the German state of Baden-Württemberg and the French region of Grand Est. Since 2018, they coordinate under the name trireno the future extension of the S-Bahn.

Operations
Due to various factors, the service frequency of the five suburban train lines is not the same. Lines S1 (between Basel SBB and Stein-Säckingen) and S3 (between Olten and Laufen) with a large patronage run every half hour. Lines with medium ridership (TER, RB30, RB27, S5 and S6) operate every half hour during peak hours and generally at hourly intervals during off-peak hours and on weekends. Lines with low ridership (S1 between Stein-Säckingen and Laufenburg/Frick, S3 between Laufen and Porrentruy and S9) operate at hourly intervals. Due to operating in three countries, this pattern of operations is not only determined by demand, but also by the various national and local governments involved.

Two S-Bahn services operate on each of the lines between Basel SBB and Pratteln and between Lörrach-Stetten and Steinen, resulting in a 15 minute frequency on these lines. During peak hours additional services operate.

Proposals

The Herzstück Basel project involves the planning and construction of a tunnel through Basel city centre, providing a more direct link between Basel Badische Bahnhof and Basel SBB via two new underground stations, "Basel Mitte" and "Basel Klybeck".

Lines 
The following lines currently operate:

 : Basel SBB – Rheinfelden – Stein-Säckingen – Frick / Laufenburg.
 : Porrentruy – Delémont – Laufen – Basel SBB – Liestal – Sissach – Olten
 : Weil am Rhein – Lörrach Hbf – Steinen (– Schopfheim – Zell (Wiesental))
 : Basel SBB – Basel Bad Bf – Riehen – Lörrach Hbf – Steinen – Schopfheim – Zell (Wiesental)
 : Sissach – Läufelfingen – Olten
 : Mulhouse – Basel SBB
 : (Basel SBB –) Basel Bad Bf – Müllheim (Baden) – Freiburg (Breisgau) Hbf
 : Basel Bad Bf – Rheinfelden (Baden) – Bad Säckingen – Laufenburg (Baden) – Waldshut – Lauchringen

The lines S1, S3 and S9 operate exclusively in Switzerland, line TER between Switzerland and France, line S6, RB27 and RB30 between Switzerland and Germany, and the line S5 in Germany only.

The 357 km long railway network currently includes 108 stations and stops, of which 47 are in Switzerland, 54 in Germany and 7 are in France. The shortest line is the S5 (14 km) and the longest line is S3 (106 km).

Fare networks

The trireno is operating in the integrated fare networks triregio (fare network) (twn, RVL, distribus, SNCF TER), twn, RVF, RVL, and TER Grand Est.

References

External links 
 

S-Bahn in Switzerland
S-Bahn
Cross-border rapid transit